The Victory Medal was a commemorative military medal of Japan awarded to mark service during the First World War. Established by Imperial Edict #406 on 17 September 1920, it was one of the series of Victory Medals created and awarded by the victorious allies after the First World War. Fifteen nations in all issued a version of the medal. All shared the rainbow suspension and service ribbon, but the medals' designs varied by country. Japan's design was different from all other versions as it did not depict the goddess Victory. This figure from Roman mythology would have no connection to Japanese culture, so a depiction of Takemikazuchi, the war god in Japanese mythology occupies the obverse of the medal.

See also 
 Japanese intervention in Siberia

References

External links
Medal - Victory Medal 1914-1918, Japan, 1920

Military awards and decorations of Japan
Interallied Victory Medals of World War I
Awards established in 1920